Budhlada Assembly constituency (Sl. No.: 98) is a Punjab Legislative Assembly constituency in Mansa district, Punjab state, India.

Members of the Legislative Assembly 
 2012: Chatin Singh
 2007: Mangat Rai Bansal
 2002: Harwant Singh Datewas

Election results

2022

2017

2012

2007

2002

Results from 20th century

References

External links
  

Assembly constituencies of Punjab, India
Mansa district, India